Hometown! is a live album by The Dubliners recorded and released in 1972. Its release was short-lived because "Raglan Road" was split across both sides of the original LP. Recorded at the National Stadium in Dublin, it featured the original members.  The album included songs that had not previously been recorded.

Track listing

Side One
 "Molly Maguires"
 "Take It Down from the Mast"
 "Sons of Roisin"
 "Barney's Mozart"
 "Raglan Road (Part 1)"

Side Two
 "Raglan Road (Part 2)"
 "The Comical Genius"
 "The Breeze (Heathery Breeze)"
 "Octopus Jig"
 "Kimmage"
 "Hand Me Down My Bible"
 "Monto"

The Dubliners live albums
1972 live albums
Albums produced by Phil Coulter